Silvan Jeremy Wallner (born 15 January 2002) is a Swiss professional footballer who plays as a defender for Swiss club Wil on loan from Zürich.

Career statistics

Club

References

2002 births
Living people
Swiss men's footballers
Switzerland youth international footballers
Association football defenders
Swiss Super League players
FC Zürich players
FC Wil players
Swiss people of Austrian descent
Footballers from Zürich